USS Grosbeak (AMc-19) was a Grosbeak-class coastal minesweeper acquired by the U.S. Navy for the dangerous task of removing mines from minefields laid in the water to prevent ships from passing.

Grosbeak, the former wooden purse seiner Del Rio was built by J. M. Martinac, Tacoma, Washington, in 1935; and commissioned 11 November 1940, Ens. T. F. Martin in command.

World War II service 

Following conversion to an auxiliary minesweeper at Alameda, California, Grosbeak joined Mine Division 1 at San Francisco Bay and nearby waters, but she was also used for training reserve and junior officers in small boat handling and minesweeping.

Deactivation 

Grosbeak decommissioned 12 September 1944. Her name was struck from the Navy List 14 October; and she was returned to her former owner at San Pedro, California, 2 April 1945.

References

External links 
 NavSource Online: Mine Warfare Vessel Photo Archive - Grosbeak (AMc 19)

Minesweepers of the United States Navy
Ships built in Tacoma, Washington
1935 ships
World War II mine warfare vessels of the United States